Lippstadt Community is an unincorporated community in Warren County, in the U.S. state of Missouri.

History
Variant names are "Lippestadt" and "Lippstadt". The community was named after Lippe, Germany, the native home of a large share of the first settlers.

References

Unincorporated communities in Warren County, Missouri
Unincorporated communities in Missouri